Paeonia or Paionia may refer to:

 The genus Paeonia, which comprises all peony plants
 Paeonia (kingdom), an ancient state occupying roughly the same area as the present-day Republic of North Macedonia
 Paionia (municipality), in the Central Macedonia region of Greece
 Paeonia, alternate name of Paeonidae, a deme of ancient Attica
 1061 Paeonia, an asteroid

See also 
 Pionia (disambiguation)